Dawn – National Coalition, short Dawn, (from June 2014 to August 2015) Dawn of Direct Democracy or (from June 2013 to June 2014) Tomio Okamura's Dawn of Direct Democracy, was a right-wing populist, Eurosceptic political party in the Czech Republic.

Origins
The party was founded in May 2013 by Tomio Okamura, an independent senator attached to the Christian Democratic parliamentary group. Tomio Okamura's Dawn of Direct Democracy supported the implementation of direct democracy at all levels "as a solution to the corruption, nepotism, clientelism and kleptocracy," the use of referendums, the direct election of deputies, senators, mayors and regional governors, a presidential system and, consequently, a stronger separation of powers.

Founding members of Dawn of Direct Democracy included members of Public Affairs, a former member of the Civic Democratic Party, and a representative of Moravané.

In the parliamentary election of 2013 the party obtained 342,339 votes (6.88%), winning 14 seats. These included two deputies elected in the Central Bohemian Region, and one each in all others except the Plzen Region and Karlovy Vary Region.

Party split

In February 2015, most of the nine members of the party and the 14 members of the Dawn parliamentary group decided to establish a new party, without leader Tomio Okamura. On 26 February 2015, Okamura announced that the party was experiencing serious financial difficulties. Since their election to the parliament, the party had been receiving millions of Czech crowns from the state each year.

Several members of Dawn have created new parties, including Freedom and Direct Democracy, led by Okamura, and the Party of National Interests led by Petr Adam.

On 7 July 2015, Dawn announced plans to merge with the Party of the National Interests, which they did in August the same year. Retired veteran Miroslav Lidinský was elected as party chairman and the name was changed to Dawn – National Coalition. They also began working with the We Don't Want Islam in the Czech Republic movement led by Martin Konvička. However, this collaboration also failed soon after, and Dawn's popularity has continued to decline. According to opinion polling, Dawn was unlikely to exceed the threshold for entry into parliament at the 2017 legislative elections.

Dawn MP Martin Lank left the party in May 2017, which reduced the parliamentary group to six MPs, further reduced to five on 6 June 2017 with the departure of Jana Hnyková. On 7 June 2017, Marek Černoch also left Dawn.

Dawn did not participate in the 2017 legislative election. In July 2017, prominent party members stated their intention to participate in local elections in 2018. The party was dissolved in March 2018.

Election results

Chamber of Deputies

Senate

European Parliament

Local election

Leaders
Tomio Okamura 2013-2015
 2015
Miroslav Lidinský Since 2015

References

Further reading

External links

2013 establishments in the Czech Republic
Political parties established in 2013
National conservative parties in the Czech Republic
Defunct political parties in the Czech Republic
Direct democracy parties in the Czech Republic
Eurosceptic parties in the Czech Republic
Right-wing populism in the Czech Republic
Anti-Islam political parties in the Czech Republic
Nationalist parties in the Czech Republic
Right-wing parties in the Czech Republic
Anti-immigration politics in Europe
Freedom and Direct Democracy
Political parties disestablished in 2018
2018 disestablishments in the Czech Republic
Defunct nationalist parties
Defunct conservative parties
Defunct far-right parties
Far-right political parties in the Czech Republic
Right-wing populist parties